Howard Michael Kremer (born February 3, 1971), also known by his stage name Dragon Boy Suede and his nicknames H. Michael Kre and Howie Michael Motorcycle, is an American comedian and comedic rapper. Howard Kremer is the host of the Who Charted? podcast, available on the Earwolf podcasting empire and formerly co-hosted with Kulap Vilaysack. He also co-hosts the podcast Grifthorse with writer/comedian/actor Megan Koester.

Personal life
Kremer was raised in Matawan, New Jersey. He has a twin sister, Nancy, as well as an older sister and an older brother, Leigh. Kremer often impersonates Leigh (Lee) in his comedy. After attending New York University, and Monmouth University (where he hosted a radio program), Kremer moved to Austin, TX where he pursued a career in stand-up comedy. With his writing partner, Brad "Chip" Pope, Kremer created the MTV single-camera comedy series Austin Stories. After the success of Austin Stories, Kremer moved to Los Angeles, CA to further his writing career.

Career
Apart from a lead role on Austin Stories, and a half-hour special on Comedy Central Presents, Kremer's acting work includes recurring roles on  Scare Tactics and the IFC series Comedy Bang! Bang!.  Other television guest appearances include Adventure Time, Pretend Time, The Meltdown with Jonah and Kumail, @midnight, Brody Stevens: Enjoy It! and Jimmy Kimmel Live!.

He hosts the podcast Who Charted? on the Earwolf network.

He co-hosts the podcast Grifthorse with Megan Koester.

Kremer is a noted musician who contributes theme songs to the Who Charted? podcast and was featured in the song "Pi" by Hard 'n Phirm.  With Dustin Marshall and Brett Morris as producers and contributors, Kremer has released four "Summah"-themed albums. As his alter ego, Dragon Boy Suede, Kremer has released three hip-hop albums.

Discography

Stand Up
 The Attempt (2018)

Music

As Dragon Boy Suede
 Dragon Boy Suede (2006)
 Master of Pheromonies (2009)
 Douche Minutiae (2013)
 Tears on My Shaft (2016 [TBA])

As Howard Kremer
 Have a Summah (2012)
 Have Anothah Summah (2013)
 Summah This Summah That (2014)
 Summahtology (2015)
 Oculus Summah (2016)

References

External links
 

American comedy musicians
American rappers
American stand-up comedians
American podcasters
Living people
People from Matawan, New Jersey
21st-century American rappers
1971 births